is a female Japanese singer from Saitama Prefecture who has performed theme songs for games and anime. She made her major singing debut in 2004 with the single KIZUNA～. Her first album ARCHIVE LOVERS was released in 2007. She is attached to 5pb. Ayane, previously known by her real name as Junko Hirata, was a member of the band  with Tatsuya "Tatsh" Shimizu.

Discography

Singles
KIZUNA～ (released October 20, 2004)
KIZUNA～ — anime television W Wish opening theme
Fly away — PS2 game W Wish ending theme

ORANGE (released November 10, 2004)
ORANGE — PS2 game Memories Off #5 Togireta Film opening theme
 (Romancing Story) — PS2 game Memories Off #5 Togireta Film ending theme

ribbon (released February 2, 2005)
ribbon — PS2 game Memories Off After Rain opening theme
After Rain — PS2 game Memories Off After Rain ending theme

Film Makers (released March 29, 2006)
Film Makers — OVA Memories Off #5 Togireta Film THE ANIMATION opening theme
～for memories～ ( ~for memories~)
Film Makers (Concert Ver.) (recorded from the 2006.02.12 MemoOff Valentine Concert)

嘆きノ森 (released February 22, 2007)
 — PS2 game Higurashi no Naku Koro ni Matsuri opening theme
 (Complex Image) — PS2 game  Miotsukushi-hen opening theme

DOLPHIN☆JET (released July 25, 2007)
DOLPHIN☆JET — anime television Kenkō Zenrakei Suieibu Umishō opening theme
New Breeze — PS2 game Umisho ending theme

cloudier sky (released January 25, 2008)
cloudier sky — anime television AYAKASHI opening theme
WiSH ON TRUTH

Lunatic Tears... (released May 7, 2008)
Lunatic Tears... — PC game 11 eyes opening theme
 — PC game 11 eyes insert song

 (released December 24, 2008)
 — PSP game Higurashi Daybreak opening theme
Key of Dream

Endless Tears... (released April 1, 2009)
Endless Tears... — Xbox 360 game 11eyes CrossOver opening theme


GRAVITY ERROR (released April 22, 2009)
GRAVITY ERROR — PS2 game Trigger Heart Exelica Enhanced opening theme
 — PSP game Memories Off #5 Togireta Film opening theme

Arrival of Tears (released October 21, 2009)
Arrival of Tears — Anime television 11eyes opening song
 — PSP game 11eyes CrossOver opening theme

Angelic bright (released March 10, 2010)
Angelic bright — DS game  insert song
 — DS game  ending song

 (released August 25, 2010)
 — PC game 11 eyes-Resona Forma- opening theme
 — Xbox 360 game Memories Off Yubikiri no Kioku true ending song

Crest of Knights (released August 24, 2011)
Crest of Knights — online game Chevalier Saga Tactics theme song
GO→Love&Peace — PS3 game Choujigen Game Neptune mk2 ending song
Fullmoon Rhapsody — PC game  insert song

cry out (released June 20, 2012)
cry out – Anime-TV May 2012 opening theme
Red Rose Evangel – arcade game Taiko no Tatsujin playable song
Reckless fire – s-CRY-ed opening theme cover song

 (released April 24, 2013)
 – Steins;Gate Fuka Ryouiki no Déjà vu ending song
Foresight Oscillator

 (released May 29, 2013)
 (Phenogram) - PS3/Xbox 360 game Steins;Gate: Senkei Kōsoku no Phenogram opening theme
 - Memories Off 6: Complete opening theme

 (released August 28, 2013)
 ( Crossroad) - Disorder 6 opening theme
 (Perfect ☆ Quest) - Ultradimension Idol Neptune PP ending song
 Wall5 Remix (Perfect ☆ Quest)

 (released November 24, 2013)
 - PS VITA game Steins;Gate: Senkei Kōsoku no Phenogram opening theme

GO→Love＆Peace Wall5 Remix

Headway! Buccaneers/never GIVE up (released July 30, 2014)
Headway! Buccaneers - PS VITA game  (Soukai Buccaneers!) opening theme
never GIVE up - Hyperdimension Neptunia Re;birth 2 Sister's Generation ending theme

Albums
ARCHIVE LOVERS (released April 25, 2007)
ORANGE — PS2 game Memories Off#5: Togireta Film opening theme
Private Place' — PS2 game Ryuukoku opening theme
 — PS2 game  opening theme
After Rain — PS2 game Memories Off After Rain ending theme
ARCHIVE LOVERS
 — PC game Suika A.S+ ending theme
Film Makers — OVA Memories Off #5 Togireta Film THE ANIMATION opening theme
 (Complex Image) — PS2 game  opening theme
To the Moon — PS2 game I/O insert song
 — PS2 game Ryuukoku ending theme
 — PS2 game  opening theme
 (Orchestra ver.) (Kakashi (Orchestra ver.)) /  — PC game Suika A.S+ grand ending theme
 (Romancing Story) — PS2 game Memories Off #5 Togireta Film ending theme

HYPER  TRANCE～～ (released May 25, 2007)
 (Ver.) (Tsuki to Yozora to Houkiboshi (Trance Ver.)) — PC game Yanezutai no Kimi e opening theme
ORANGE (Ver. (Trance Ver.))
To the Moon (Ver. (Trance Ver.))
Private place (Ver. (Trance Ver.))
(Ver.) (Complex Image (Trance Ver.))
Fractal Tree (Ver. (Trance Ver.))
Film Makers (Ver. (Trance Ver.))
(Ver.) ( (Trance Ver.))
 (Ver.) ( (Trance Ver.))
 (Ver.) (Romancing Story (Trance Ver.))
 (Ver.) (Majokko Megu-chan (Trance Ver.))

ELEPHANT NOTES (released August 06, 2008)
 — PS2 game Memories Off #5 encore opening theme
Lunatic Tears... — PC game 11 eyes opening theme
DOLPHIN☆JET — anime television Kenkō Zenrakei Suieibu Umishō opening theme
Everlasting Sky — PS2 game Que -Fairy of ancient leaf- ending theme
ribbon — PS2 game Memories Off After Rain opening theme
 — PS2 game Kono Aozora ni Yakusoku o- ~melody of the sun and sea~ insert song
 — PC game  ending theme
 (Eien no Memories)
cloudier sky — anime television AYAKASHI
New Breeze — PS2 game Umisho ending theme
Close Your Eyes — PC game G Senjō no Maō ending theme

KIZUNA～ — anime television W Wish opening theme


HYPER  TRANCE II ～～ (released July 23, 2009)
 (Ver.) ( (Trance Ver.))
ARCHIVE LOVERS (Ver. (Trance Ver.))
WiSH ON TRUTH (Ver. (Trance Ver.))
Private place (Ver. (Trance Ver.))
Drive on dragoon (Ver. (Trance Ver.))
DOLPHIN☆JET (Ver. (Trance Ver.))
Endless Tears... (Ver. (Trance Ver.))
 (Ver.) ( (Trance Ver.))
cloudier sky (Ver. (Trance Ver.))
Lunatic Tears... (Ver. (Trance Ver.))
 (Ver.) (Eien no Memories (Trance Ver.))
SEASON～cover(Ver.) (Heart no SEASON ~ Cover (Trance Ver.))

Lyricallya Candles (released December 22, 2010)
Shining gate — TV show Anison Plus December, 2010 opening theme
GRAVITY ERROR — PS2 game Trigger Heart Exelica Enhanced opening theme
 — PSP game Memories Off #5 Togireta Film opening theme
 — OVA  ending theme
Endless Tears... — Xbox 360 game 11eyes CrossOver opening theme
Arrival of Tears — Anime television 11eyes opening song
 — Xbox 360 game Memories Off 6 Next Relation ending theme
 — Xbox 360 game Memories Off Yubikiri no Kioku true ending song
 — PSP game Higurashi Daybreak opening theme
Angelic bright — DS game  insert song
 — PC game  ending theme
Drive on dragoon —  Image Song
 — PC game 11 eyes-Resona Forma- opening theme
 — DS game  ending song
 — PSP game 11eyes CrossOver

HYPER DANCE REMIX ～～ (released December 26, 2012)
Arrival of Tears -void remix-
ribbon -toku(GARNiDELiA) Remix-
 -nostalgic anthem mix-
Angelic bright -SHIKI Remix-
cry out -SWYK mix-
Crest of Knights -Contents are red mix-
GRAVITY ERROR -axsword remix-
 -Solt Five Remix-
Fullmoon Rhapsody -naughty protein mix-
New Breeze -ju-ri-mix-
After rain -nh remix-
1/3 -ju-ri-mix-

Base Ten (released October 8, 2014)
KIZUNA ~ ~10th anniv.ver.~	
STARLIGHT TWILIGHT	
ribbon ~10th anniv.ver.~	
Kamen no Shita no Ballad	
Zankoku na Tenshi no Thesis	
Sousei no Aquarion	
Nageki no Mori ~acoustic ver.~	
ORANGE ~acoustic ver.~	
Complex Image ~acoustic ver.~	
Next Relation

Other
 — crystal2 ~Circus Vocal Collection~ Vol.2
 —  opening song
Fractal Tree — PS2 game Que -Fairy of ancient leaf- opening theme
 — Wii game  insert song
After Rain (Live ver.) — THE WORKS 
 — FAR EAST OF EAST / Tatsh Music Circle Touhou project Arrange ＣＤ
 — Wii game Taiko no Tatsujin Wii: Do Don to 2 Daime
Close Your Eyes (kors k mix) - ULTRA RELOAD Vol.1 feat. AKABEi SOFT2
Lunatic Tears... (DJ Shimamura Remix) — SUPER SHOT3:  Game Remix Collection
Red Rose Evangel — Arcade game  playable song
Purple Rose Fusion - Arcade game  playable song
 - Fractional Vision (Kakusei - Fractional Vision) - Visual Novel SINCLIENT theme song
Divine Beast -  1/1 character theme song
Re-Start - !! -IDOL Communication- ending theme
punitive justice～～ - PC game  -The Garden of Fifth Zoa- ending theme
 (Symphonic Ver.) - STEINS;GATE SYMPHONIC REUNION
REALIZE (vocals) - Cytus

With 
CARRY ON NIGHT (English Version) — "beatmania IIDX 10th Style"
PLATONIC-XXX — "beatmania IIDX 10th Style"
Don't be afraid myself — "beatmania IIDX 11: RED"
Under the Sky (with Sayaka Minami from BeForU) — "beatmania IIDX 12: HAPPY SKY" & "Dance Dance Revolution SuperNOVA 2"
Xepher (with Yumi Natori) — "beatmania IIDX 12: HAPPY SKY"
DOUBLE ♥♥ LOVING HEART (with Sayaka Minami from BeForU) — "beatmania IIDX 13: DistorteD"
CARRY ON NIGHT (Dub's Old Gamers Remix) — "V-RARE SOUNDTRACK 12"
Don't be afraid myself (trance edge mix) — "V-RARE SOUNDTRACK 14"

As Junko Hirata
Xepher (ver1.1) (with Tatsh and Yumi Natori) — "Bemani Top Ranker Ketteisen"
 (ver0.99) (Gekkou (ver0.99)) — "Bemani Top Ranker Ketteisen"
Love Again... (with Tatsh) — "beatmania IIDX 11: RED CS"
With Your Smile (with Shoichiro Hirata) — "beatmania IIDX 14: GOLD"
 (with Tatsh) — "pop'n music 14 FEVER!"
Love Again... 'Brand New Life Mix' - Tatsh album MATERIAL
 'Graduation Mix' - Tatsh album MATERIAL

Songs written for other artists
GLORY DAYS (lyrics) — from W Wish, performed by Saeko Chiba
WONDERLAND (lyrics & composition) — performed by Maria Yamamoto
MOON PARTY (lyrics & composition) — performed by CoCo☆HONEYMOON (Atsuko Enomoto & Maria Yamamoto)
LOVE&HISTORY (lyrics & composition) — performed by Maria Yamamoto
Reijou Doll (lyrics) — PC game Reijou Trader opening theme, performed by Yuuri Nashimoto
Gekkou (lyrics) — "beatmania IIDX 12: HAPPY SKY" performed by Kanako Hoshino
Lunatic Tears... (lyrics) — "EXIT TRANCE PRESENTS SPEED ANIME TRANCE BEST ECSTASY" performed by xue
Next Relation (lyrics) — Xbox 360 game Memories Off 6 Next Relation opening song, performed by Velforest.

External links
Official website 
Choco-bana — Ayane Official Blog

Anime musical groups
Japanese women singers
Year of birth missing (living people)
Living people
Musicians from Saitama Prefecture